Patrick Nielsen (born September 18, 1996) is a Danish footballer who currently plays for Avarta.

Career
Nielsen played with the academy teams at Brøndby and AB.

In 2016, Nielsen moved to the United States to play college soccer at the University of Cincinnati. During his freshman year, Nielsen made 17 appearances and tallied two assists. During his sophomore year, Nielsen didn't appear for the Bearcats, but played back in Denmark with Hvidovre IF and in the USL PDL with Nashville SC U23.

In 2018, Nielsen transferred to Michigan State University, where he played for two seasons, making 33 appearances, scoring three goals and tallying two assists for the Spartans.

Nielsen also appeared in the USL League Two with Flint City Bucks in 2018 and 2019.

On 9 January 2020, Nielsen was selected 23rd overall in the 2020 MLS SuperDraft by Atlanta United. On 29 June 2020, it was announced that Nielsen would join Atlanta's USL Championship side Atlanta United 2. He made his professional debut on 5 August 2020, appearing as a half-time substitute during a 1–1 draw with Charleston Battery.

References

1996 births
Association football defenders
Atlanta United 2 players
Atlanta United FC draft picks
Cincinnati Bearcats men's soccer players
Danish men's footballers
Danish expatriate men's footballers
Danish expatriate sportspeople in the United States
Expatriate soccer players in the United States
Flint City Bucks players
Hvidovre IF players
Living people
Michigan State Spartans men's soccer players
USL Championship players
USL League Two players
Footballers from Copenhagen